Kristinn Björnsson (born 13 September 1955) is a retired Icelandic football striker and later manager.

References

1955 births
Living people
Kristinn Bjornsson
Kristinn Bjornsson
Kristinn Bjornsson
Vålerenga Fotball players
Kvik Halden FK players
Kristinn Bjornsson
Association football forwards
Kristinn Bjornsson
Expatriate footballers in Norway
Kristinn Bjornsson
Eliteserien players
Kristinn Bjornsson
Kristinn Bjornsson
Kristinn Bjornsson
Kristinn Bjornsson
Kristinn Bjornsson